Lisa Marie Henson (born May 9, 1960) is an American television and film producer and former actress who has been involved in television shows such as Sid the Science Kid. She is the CEO of The Jim Henson Company, founded by her parents Jim and Jane Henson.

Early life
Henson was born in Westchester County, New York, the daughter and the oldest child of puppeteers Jane (née Nebel; 1934–2013) and Jim Henson (1936–1990). She has four younger siblings: Cheryl (born 1961), Brian (born 1963), John (1965–2014), and Heather Henson (born 1970).

Career
Henson is the CEO of The Jim Henson Company.

Besides her direct television and movie work, she has been president of production for Columbia Pictures, and an executive for Warner Brothers. She holds a degree from Harvard University, where she majored in folklore and mythology and served as the first female president of the Harvard Lampoon. She has also served on the Harvard Board of Overseers.

Filmography

Shorts

Television

Film

References

External links

Profile at Jim Henson Company

1960 births
American film producers
The Harvard Lampoon alumni
Henson family (show business)
Jim Henson
Living people
Television producers from New York (state)
The Jim Henson Company people
People from Westchester County, New York
Primetime Emmy Award winners
American women television producers
Presidents of Columbia Pictures